There were two Governments of the 6th Dáil, which was elected at the September 1927 general election held on 15 September 1927. The 4th Executive Council (11 October 1927 – 2 April 1930) and the 5th Executive Council (2 April 1930 – 9 March 1932) were both minority governments of Cumann na nGaedheal led by W. T. Cosgrave as President of the Executive Council.

The 4th Executive Council lasted for  days from its appointment until it resigned from office, and continued to carry out its duties until the appointment of its successor for a further 5 days, for a total of  days. The 5th Executive Council lasted for  days.

4th Executive Council of the Irish Free State

Nomination of President of the Executive Council
The members of the 6th Dáil first met on 11 October 1927. In the debate on the nomination of the President of the Executive Council, Cumann na nGaedheal leader and outgoing President W. T. Cosgrave was proposed, and this resolution was carried with 76 votes in favour and 70 against. Cosgrave was then appointed as President of the Executive Council by Governor-General Tim Healy.

Members of the Executive Council
The members of the Executive Council were nominated by the President and approved by the Dáil on 12 October. They were then appointed by the Governor General.

Notes

Parliamentary Secretaries
On 13 March 1927, the Executive Council appointed Parliamentary Secretaries on the nomination of the President.

Amendments to the Constitution of the Irish Free State
The following amendments to the Constitution of the Irish Free State were proposed by the Executive Council and passed by the Oireachtas:
 Amendment No. 10 (12 July 1928): Removed all direct democracy provisions except the requirement that, after a transitional period, a referendum be held on all constitutional amendments. However this remaining provision would never be allowed to come into effect.
 Amendment No. 6 (23 July 1928): Replaced the direct election of the Senate with a system of indirect election.
 Amendment No. 13 (23 July 1928): Extended the Senate's power of delay over legislation from nine months to twenty months.
 Amendment No. 8 (25 October 1928): Reduced the age of eligibility for senators from 35 to 30.
 Amendment No. 9 (25 October 1928): Altered provisions relating to the procedure for nominating candidates to stand in senatorial elections.
 Amendment No. 7 (30 October 1928): Reduced the term of office of senators from twelve to nine years.
 Amendment No. 14 (14 May 1929): Clarified a technical matter relating to the relationship between the two houses of the Oireachtas.
 Amendment No. 15 (14 May 1929): Permitted one member of the Executive Council to be a senator, where previously it had been required that all be members of the Dáil. It was still required that the President, Vice-President and Minister for Finance hold seats in the Dáil.
 Amendment No. 16 (14 May 1929): Extended the period during which amendments of the constitution could be made by ordinary legislation from eight to sixteen years.
 Amendment No. 11 (17 December 1929): Altered the method for filling casual vacancies in the Seanad by providing for a vote of both houses rather than just the Seanad.
 Amendment No. 12 (24 March 1930): Altered provisions relating to the Committee of Privileges that had authority to resolves disputes over the definition of a money bill.

Resignation of the Executive Council
On 27 March 1930, the Old Age Pensions Bill 1929, a private member's bill proposed by Conn Ward a member of Fianna Fáil, which was the lead party of the parliamentary opposition, passed second stage by 66 votes to 64. This occurred in part due to absences from the government benches, including Séamus Burke, Parliamentary Secretary to the Minister for Finance, as well as Independent TDs who regularly supported the government.

The following day, the President tendered his resignation to the Governor-General. The Executive Council continued to carry out its duties under Article 53 of the Constitution until the appointment of its successor.

5th Executive Council of the Irish Free State

Nomination of President of the Executive Council
In the debate on the nomination of the President of the Executive Council on 2 April 1930, Fianna Fáil leader Éamon de Valera, 
Labour Party Leader Thomas J. O'Connell, and Cumann na nGaedheal leader and outgoing President W. T. Cosgrave were each proposed. The motions proposing de Valera and O'Connell were defeated, while the motion proposing Cosgrave was carried with 80 votes in favour to 65 votes against. Cosgrave was then appointed as President of the Executive Council by Governor-General James McNeill.

Members of the Executive Council
The members of the Executive Council were nominated by the President and approved by the Dáil on 3 April. They were then appointed by the Governor General.

Parliamentary Secretaries
On 3 April 1930, the Executive Council appointed Parliamentary Secretaries on the nomination of the President.

Amendment to the Constitution of the Irish Free State
The following amendment to the Constitution of the Irish Free State was proposed by the Executive Council and passed by the Oireachtas:
 Amendment No. 17 (17 October 1931): Inserted Article 2A, which included provisions for trial by military tribunals.

External relations
The Statute of Westminster 1931 removed the power of the Parliament of the United Kingdom to pass laws affecting British Dominions, including the Irish Free State.

See also
Dáil Éireann
Government of Ireland
Constitution of the Irish Free State
Politics of the Republic of Ireland

References

Ministries of George V
Government 06
Governments of the Irish Free State
1927 establishments in Ireland
1930 disestablishments in Ireland
Cabinets established in 1927
Cabinets disestablished in 1930
1930 establishments in Ireland
1932 disestablishments in Ireland
Cabinets established in 1930
Cabinets disestablished in 1932
Minority governments
6th Dáil